Raivavae Airport  is an airport on Raivavae, part of the Austral Islands in French Polynesia. The airport is adjacent to the village of Rairua.

Airlines and destinations

Passenger

References 

Airports in French Polynesia